Superbad: The Return of Boosie Bad Azz is the fourth studio album by American rapper Lil Boosie. It was released on September 15, 2009, by Bad Azz, Asylum Records, Trill Entertainment and Warner Bros. Records. The album debuted at number 7 on the US Billboard 200 chart.

Singles
The album's lead single "Better Believe It" featuring Young Jeezy and Webbie, was released on July 14, 2009.

Track listing

References

2009 albums
Lil Boosie albums
Asylum Records albums
Warner Records albums
Albums produced by Nard & B
Albums produced by the Runners